Abhinetri may refer to:
 Abhinetri (1970 film), a Hindi film
 Abhinetri (2015 film), a Kannada film
 Abhinetri (2016 film), a Telugu version of Devi